The American Music Award for Single of the Year was awarded from 2013. In 2016, the category was divided to honor songs by their separate genres. Years reflect the year in which the awards were presented, for works released in the previous year (until 2003 onward when awards were handed out on November of the same year). Pharrell Williams is the most nominated artist with 2 nominations.

Winners and nominees

Category facts

Multiple Nominations
 2 nominations
 Pharrell Williams

See also
 American Music Award for Favorite Pop/Rock Song (1974-1995, 2016-present)
 American Music Award for Favorite Soul/R&B Song (1974-1995, 2016-present)
 American Music Award for Favorite Country Song (1974-1995, 2016-present)
 American Music Award for Favorite Disco Song (1979)
 American Music Award for Favorite Pop/Rock Song (1990-1992)
 American Music Award for Favorite Rap/Hip-Hop Song (2016-present)

References

American Music Awards
Song awards
Awards established in 2013
Awards disestablished in 2015